The Metropolitan Atlanta Rapid Transit Authority operates a number of bus routes in the Atlanta metro region. The main system operates in Fulton, DeKalb, and Clayton Counties, although some routes travel into other suburban counties.

Local

1 Marietta Boulevard / Joseph E. Lowery Boulevard (was 1C branch of Route 1 until 1999; 1H branch renumbered Route 12)
2 Ponce de Leon Avenue / Druid Hills
3 Martin Luther King Jr. Dr/Auburn Ave
4 Moreland Avenue (McDonough Boulevard / Grady Hospital section eliminated on September 25, 2010, due to budget cuts)
5 Piedmont Road/Sandy Springs 
6 Clifton Road/Emory
8 North Druid Hills Rd (Created by 1987)
9 Boulevard / Tilson Road
12 Howell Mill Rd / Cumberland (was 1H branch of Route 1 until 1999)
14 14th Street / Blandtown (Created on April 13, 2018)
15 Candler Road
19 Clairmont Road/ Howard Avenue (Created by 1987)
21 Memorial Drive 
24 McAfee/Hosea Williams (Created in 1979; Belvedere section now covered by Route 823)
25 Peachtree Industrial Boulevard
26 Marietta Street / Perry Boulevard 
27 Cheshire Bridge Road
30 Lavista Rd 
32 Bouldercrest (Created in 1979)
34 Gresham Road
36 North Decatur Rd/Virginia Highland (Created in 1979)
37 Defoors Ferry Road 
39 Buford Highway (Created by 1983)
40 Peachtree Street/Downtown (Created on December 9, 2017; previously part of Routes 42 and 110)
42 Pryor Road
47 1-85 Access Road (Created by 1987)
49 McDonough Boulevard 
50 Donald L Hollowell Pkwy (Created by 1981)
51 Joseph E Boone Blvd (Created by 1981)
55 Jonesboro Road
58 Hollywood Road / Lucille Avenue (Created by 1981)
60 Hightower Road (Created by 1981)
66 Lynhurst Drive / Princeton Lakes
68 Benjamin E. Mays Drive 
71 Cascade Road (Created by 1983)
73 Fulton Industrial 
74 Flat Shoals 
75 Lawrenceville Highway
78 Cleveland Ave (Created by 1987)
79 Sylvan Hills (Created on March 21, 2015)
81 Venetian Hills/Delowe Drive (Created by 1981)
82 Camp Creek / South Fulton Parkway 
83 Campbellton Road (Created by 1981)
84 Washington Road / Camp Creek Marketplace (Created by 1981)
85 Roswell
86 Fairington Road (was 86L branch of Route 86 until June 26, 2004; 86R branch renumbered Route 186)
87 Roswell Road / Sandy Springs (was part of Route 85 until early 2001)
89 Old National Highway (was Route 89F branch of Route 89 until June 26, 2004; 89S branch renumbered Route 189)
93 Headland Drive / Main Street (Created by 1983)
94 Northside Drive (Created on April 15, 2017)
95 Metropolitan Parkway (Created by 1983)
102 North Avenue / Live Five Points (Created on December 4, 2013)
103 Peeler Road (Created on June 26, 2004)
104 Winters Chapel Road (Created on June 26, 2004)
107 Glenwood Road (Created in 1979)
110 Peachtree Road/Buckhead (Created on October 12, 2006)
111 Snapfinger Woods (Created in late 1999)
114 Columbia Drive (Created in 1979)
115 Covington Highway (Created in 1979)
116 Redan Rd. (Created in 1979)
117 Rockbridge Rd./Panola Rd. (Created on April 28, 2007)
119 Hairston Road / Stone Mountain Village (Created on December 24, 2005)
120 East Ponce de Leon Avenue (Created in 1979) 
121 Memorial Drive / North Hairston Road (Created in 1979)
123 Church Street (Created by 1987)
124 Pleasantdale Road (Created by 1987)
125 Clarkston (Created in 1979)
126 Embry Hills (Created on June 26, 2004)
132 Tilly Mill Road (Created by 1987)
133 Shallowford Road (Created on August 18, 2018)
140 North Point Parkway (Created by 1979)
141 Haynes Bridge Road / Milton (Created on April 16, 2016)
142 East Holcomb Bridge Road  (Created on December 9, 2017)
143 Windward Park / Ride  (Created in late 1999; discontinued in early 2001; restored on September 30, 2002)
148 Mount Vernon Highway (Created by 1987)
150 Dunwoody Village (Created by 1987)
153 James Jackson Parkway (Created on December 24, 2005)
155 Pittsburgh (Created on August 18, 2007)
162 Myrtle Drive/Alison Court (Created on July 23, 2005)
165 Fairburn Rd. (Created by 1981)
172 Sylvan Road/Virginia Ave. (Created on August 18, 2007)
178 Empire Blvd./Southside Ind. Park (Created on August 18, 2007)
180 Roosevelt Highway (Created by 1987)
181 Washington Road / Fairburn (Created on April 26, 2008)
183 Greenbriar (Created on December 23, 2006)
185 Alpharetta (Created on April 28, 2007)
186 Rainbow Dr. / South DeKalb (was 86R branch of Route 86 until June 26, 2004)
188 Oakley Industrial (Created on April 20, 2020)
189 Flat Shoals Road/ Scofield Road (was Route 89S branch of Route 89 until June 26, 2004)
191 Riverdale / ATL International Terminal (Created on August 8, 2015)
192 Old Dixie / Tara Boulevard (Created on December 12, 2015)
193 Morrow / Jonesboro (Created on August 8, 2015)
194 Conley Road / Mt. Zion (Created on December 12, 2015)
195 Forest Parkway (Created on August 8, 2015)
196 Upper Riverdale (Created on March 21, 2015)
197 Battle Creek Road (Created on August 14, 2021)
198 Southlake Parkway (Created on August 14, 2021)
295 Metropolitan Campus Express (Created on December 9, 2017)
800 Lovejoy (Created on August 8, 2015)
809 Monroe Drive / Boulevard (Created on August 18, 2018)
813 Atlanta University Center (Created on April 13, 2018)
816 North Highland Avenue (Created on August 18, 2018)
823 Belvedere (Created on December 10, 2016)
825 Johnson Ferry Road (Created on August 18, 2018)
832 Grant Park (Created on August 18, 2018)
850 Carroll Heights / Fairburn Heights (Created on April 13, 2018)
853 Center Hill (Created on April 13, 2018)
856 Baker Hills / Wilson Mill Meadows (Created on April 13, 2018)
865 Boulder Park Drive (Created on April 15, 2017)
867 Peyton Place / Dixie Hills (Created on April 13, 2018)
899 Old Fourth Ward (Created on August 18, 2018)

Shuttles
201 Six Flags Over Georgia

Limited Bus Service
221 Memorial Drive Limited. (Numbered 121L until May 17, 2014)

Discontinued
1C Coronet Way (Renumbered Route 1 in late 1999)
1G Garden Hills (Renumbered Route 43G by 1983)
1H Howell Mill Road (Renumbered Route 12 in late 1999)
1I Inman Yards (Renamed Route 1C by 1973)
1S Soldiers Home (Eliminated in 1979)
2A Ashby (Eliminated by 1977)
2F Frederica (Eliminated by 1977)
2F Fairburn/Palmetto (renumbered Route 180 by 1987)
2P Ponce De Leon/Decatur (merged with Route 2W to form Route 2 by 1981)
2W West View (merged with Route 2W to form Route 2 by 1981)
3I Irwin Street (Renamed Route 3A by 1973)
3A Auburn Avenue/Irwin Street
3B Ben Hill (Renumbered Route 83 by 1981)
3C Chappell Road (eliminated by 1981)
3K M L King Jr Drive (eliminated by 1981)
3M Mount Olive (Renumbered Route 84 by 1981)
3W West Hunter (Renamed Route 3K by 1977)
4C Clifton (Eliminated by 1978)
4F Federal Prison (Renamed Route 4 by 1987)
4L Lake Claire (Eliminated in 1979)
4R Ridgewood/West Wesley (renumbered Route 44 by 1987)
6A Atlanta Avenue (Renamed Route 97A in 1979)
6B Boulevard-8th (Eliminated by 1993)
6C Clairmont (Merged into Route 6E by 1977)
6E Emory (Renamed Route 6 in 1979)
6G Georgia Avenue (Renamed Route 97G in 1979)
6J (Eliminated by 1987)
6N (Eliminated by 1993)
6V (Eliminated by 1993)
7Co Columbia Road (Route 7 was split by 1975; merged with Route 7Cv to form Route 7 in 1979)
7Cv Covington Road (Route 7 was split by 1975; merged with Route 7Co to form Route 7 in 1979)
7 McAfee (Eliminated on September 25, 2010, due to budget cuts)
8C Center Hill (Eliminated by 1981)
8S Shoppers' Special (Renamed Route 8 by 1981)
8 Shoppers' Special (Eliminated by 1983)
10A Ansley (Ansley section replaced by New Route 35 and rest renamed Route 10 by 1983)
10B Belvedere-Peachcrest (Eliminated in 1979)
10C Cascade Heights (Renamed Route 71C by 1983)
10P Piedmont Park (Eliminated by 1977)
10R Richland (Renamed Route 71R by 1983)
10 Peachtree (Upgraded and renumbered Route 110 on October 12, 2006)
11E English Avenue (Merged with Route 11M to form Route 11 by 1983)
11M McDaniel (Merged with Route 11E to form Route 11 by 1983)
11 English Ave./Atlanta Univ. Ctr. (Eliminated on September 25, 2010, due to budget cuts)
12 Medlock (Replaced by new branch of Route 123 by 1996)
13 Atlanta Student Movement Blvd / Hunter Hills (Renumbered Route 813 on April 14, 2018)
14 Dixie Hills (Eliminated by 1981)
14 West Peachtree/Spring Streets (Created by 1983; eliminated by 1988)
14 Bankhead/Marietta (Created by 1993; eliminated on June 26, 2004, due to budget cuts; covered by Routes 1, 26, and 52; restored as a branch of the 26 so that Route 14 could be used for the 14th Street route)
16N Noble (Merged with Route 16S to form Route 16 by 1983)
16S Sylvan Hills (Merged with Route 16N to form Route 16 by 1983)
16 North Highland Avenue (Renumbered Route 816 on August 18, 2018)
17D Decatur (Merged with Route 17L to form Route 17 by 1981)
17J Jonesboro Road (Renumbered Route 90 by 1977)
17L Lakewood (Merged with Route 17D to form Route 17 by 1981)
17M Main Decatur (Renamed Route 17D in 1979)
17 Hank Aaron Dr./Grady Hospital (Eliminated on September 25, 2010, due to budget cuts)
18C Candler/Glenwood (Merged with Route 18S to form Route 18 in 1979)
18S South Decatur (Merged with Route 18C to form Route 18 in 1979)
18 South Decatur (Eliminated on September 25, 2010, due to budget cuts)
19B Browntown Road (Eliminated by 1981)
19C Bankhead-Chappell Road (Eliminated by 1981)
19R River (Eliminated by 1981)
20C College Park (Renamed Route 20 by 1987)
20F Ford Plant (Eliminated by 1973)
20H Hapeville (Replaced by new Route 77 by 1987)
20 College Park (Eliminated on June 26, 2004, due to budget cuts; restored on October 2, 2004 (only on part of the previous route), but renumbered Route 320 on December 24, 2005)
21M Mountain Industrial District/Doctors Hospital (Merged with Route 21P to form Route 21 in 1979)
21P Memorial Drive Park & Ride (Merged with Route 21M to form Route 21 in 1979)
22 Avondale/DeKalb College/Pine Lake (Transformed into the 22 Second Avenue (which it shares only one street with) in 1979)
22 Second Avenue (Eliminated on September 25, 2010, due to budget cuts)
23B Buckhead (Eliminated by 1987)
23L Lenox Square (Eliminated by 1987)
23O Oglethorpe (Eliminated by 1987)
23W West Peachtree (Eliminated by 1987)
23 Peachtree Rd./Buckhead (Eliminated on August 15, 2009; combined with Route 110 due to budget cuts)
24 Northland (Reduced to special limited service by 1981; eliminated by 1987; duplicated the current 24 (created in 1979))
27H Hapeville via Stewart (Renumbered Route 95 by 1987)
27M Monroe Drive (Renamed Route 27 by 1987)
28 Northwest (Reduced to special limited service by 1981; eliminated by 1987; duplicated the other 28 (created in 1979))
28 Village of East Lake (Eliminated on September 25, 2010, due to budget cuts)
29 Chamblee / Donaldson (Eliminated on July 22, 2006, and transferred to Route 70 and new Route 129)
31M Memorial / Grant Park (Renamed Route 31G by 1975)
31G Grant Park (Merged into Route 31 by 1981; still shown on system maps through 2002–10)
31M Morningside (Merged into Route 31 by 1981)
31W Morningside-Wildwood (Renamed Route 31M by 1977)
31 Grant Park (Eliminated on July 23, 2005, and transferred to Route 97 and new Route 197 due to budget cuts)
32C Cooper Street (Replaced by rerouted Route 42 by 1979, when current Route 32 was created)
33 Howell Mill-Argonne (Reduced to special limited service by 1981; eliminated by 1987)
33 Briarcliff Road/Shallowford Road (Renumbered Route 133 on August 18, 2018)
35D Decatur Street (Eliminated in 1979)
35M Magnolia (Eliminated by 1981)
35 Grady Hospital (Created by 1981; eliminated by 1983)
35 Ansley Park (Created by 1983; eliminated on March 23, 2002, due to budget cuts)
36 Briarcliff (Eliminated by 1977)
37L Luckie/Loring Heights (Merged with Route 37S to form Route 37 by 1983)
37S Luckie/State (Merged with Route 37L to form Route 37 by 1983)
38 Paces Ferry (Eliminated by 1987)
38 Chastain Park (Eliminated on September 25, 2010, due to budget cuts)
39 Highland / North Moreland (Eliminated in 1979)
39 Hollywood & Vine (Created in 1979; eliminated by 1983; current Route 39 was created by 1983)
40 Cagle Limited (Eliminated by 1973)
40 Decatur / North Springs (Created in 1979; eliminated by 1987)
40 West Paces Ferry / Garden Hills (Created by 1987; eliminated on June 26, 2004, due to low ridership; covered by Routes 23, 38, 44, and 58)
41 Piedmont (Eliminated by 1987)
41 Windsor Parkway / Lake Hearn (Created by 1987; renumbered Route 341 on August 18, 2007)
42C Carver Homes (Eliminated when entire route became known as Route 42 by 1993)
42H Highpoint (Eliminated when entire route became known as Route 42 by 1993)
42J Joyland (Eliminated when entire route became known as Route 42 by 1993)
42V Village (Eliminated when entire route became known as Route 42 by 1993)
43 Peachtree / Dunwoody (Reduced to special limited service by 1981; eliminated by 1987)
43G Garden Hills (Created by 1983; became Route 43 by 1987 when the main route was eliminated)
43 Garden Hills (merged into Route 40 by 1988)
44 Skyland/Ashford (Eliminated by 1987)
44 Northside Drive (Created by 1987; eliminated on September 25, 2010, due to budget cuts)
45 Virginia Highland (Eliminated on September 25, 2010, due to budget cuts)
46 Citadel/Fairway (Eliminated by 1977)
46 Boulevard/St. Charles (Eliminated on June 26, 2004, due to budget cuts)
47 Lynhurst (Eliminated by 1981; current Route 47 was created by 1987)
48 Gordon Foods Limited (Eliminated by 1975)
48 Moreland Avenue (Created in 1979; eliminated on August 18, 2007; combined with Route 4 McDonough Boulevard / Grady Hospital)
50 Farmers' Market (Reduced to special limited service by 1981; renumbered Route 350 by 1987)
51 Lake Forest (Reduced to special limited service by 1981; eliminated by 1987)
52 Glenridge Forest (Reduced to special limited service by 1981 (when the most recent Route 52 was created); eliminated by 1987)
52 Knight Park (Created by 1981; eliminated on September 25, 2010, due to budget cuts)
53 Mount Vernon Woods (Reduced to special limited service by 1981 (when the most recent Route 53 was created); eliminated by 1987)
53 Skipper Drive/West Lake Avenue (Created by 1981; renumbered Route 853 on April 14, 2018)
54 Empire Blvd./Polar Rock (Eliminated on September 25, 2010, due to budget cuts)
56 Adamsville/Collier Heights (Renumbered Route 856 on April 14, 2018)
57 Collier Heights (Eliminated on September 25, 2010, due to budget cuts)
58 Lovable (Eliminated by 1977; current Route 58 was created by 1981)
59 Londonberry (Reduced to special limited service by 1981 (when the most recent Route 59 was created); eliminated by 1987)
59 Skipper Drive (Created by 1981; eliminated on September 25, 2010, due to budget cuts)
60 Ridgemore (Reduced to special limited service by 1981 (when current Route 60 was created); eliminated by 1987)
61 Embry Hills (Eliminated by 1981)
61 Bowen Homes (Created by 1981; eliminated on July 23, 2005, due to budget cuts; covered by Routes 50 and 60; restored as Route 153 (with a slightly different routing) on December 24, 2005)
62 Headland (Merged with Route 80 to create Route 162 on July 23, 2005, due to budget cuts)
63 Flamingo (Eliminated in 1979)
63 Atlanta Univ. / Kennedy Center (Created by 1981; eliminated on June 26, 2004, due to budget cuts; combined with Routes 51 and 52)
64 Sagamore Hills (Reduced to special limited service by 1981; eliminated by 1987)
64 Beecher (Created by 1981; renumbered Route 364 on December 24, 2005)
65 Northwoods / Oakcliff (Eliminated by 1987)
65P Doraville Park & Ride (Renumbered Route 133 by 1987)
65 Chestnut / Doraville (Created by 1988 as a restoration of the previous one; eliminated on March 23, 2002, due to budget cuts)
66 Internal Revenue Service (Reduced to special limited service by 1981; eliminated by 1987)
67 C.D. Center (Eliminated by 1977)
67 Lucile Avenue / Dixie Hills (Created by 1983; renumbered Route 867 on April 14, 2018)
68 Armour Industrial District (Reduced to special limited service by 1981; eliminated by 1987)
69 Dixie Hills (Eliminated on September 25, 2010, due to budget cuts)
70 Briarwood/Century Center (Eliminated on September 25, 2010, due to budget cuts)
71 Wieuca (Eliminated by 1981)
71C Cascade Heights (Eliminated by 1993)
71R Richland (Eliminated by 1993)
72 Virginia Ave/Tradeport Blvd. (Eliminated on September 25, 2010, due to budget cuts)
76 Wyman Street (Eliminated in 1979)
76 Ft. McPherson (Created by 1987; eliminated on March 23, 2002, due to budget cuts; restored on November 8, 2004, but renumbered Route 376 on December 24, 2005)
77P Powers Ferry Estates (Reduced to special limited service by 1981; eliminated by 1987)
77R Riverside-Brandon Mill (Reduced to special limited service by 1981; eliminated by 1987)
77 Willingham Dr./Hapeville (Created by 1987; eliminated on September 25, 2010, due to budget cuts)
78 Six Flags (Renumbered Route 201 by 1981)
79 Friendly (Eliminated on June 26, 2004, due to budget cuts; combined with Route 93; restored on March 21, 2015, as 79 Sylvan Hills)
80 Brownlee (Eliminated by 1981)
80 Alison Court (Created by 1987; merged with Route 62 to create Route 162 on July 23, 2005, due to budget cuts)
81 Dairymple/Glen Courtney (Reduced to special limited service by 1981 (when current Route 81 was created); eliminated by 1987)
83 Springfield/Meadow Lake (Reduced to special limited service by 1981 (when current Route 83 was created); eliminated by 1987)
84 River Chase/Glen Eroll (Reduced to special limited service by 1981 (when current Route 84 was created); eliminated by 1987)
85P Abernathy Park & Ride (Eliminated by 1987)
86L Lithonia/Indian Creek (Renamed Route 86 on June 26, 2004)
86R Rainbow/Wesley Chapel (Renumbered Route 186 on June 26, 2004)
87 Northsprings (Merged into Routes 5 and 29 by 1987)
88 Welcome All/Camp Creek (Eliminated on September 25, 2010, due to budget cuts)
89F Flat Shoals (Renamed Route 89 on June 26, 2004)
89S Scofield (Renumbered Route 189 on June 26, 2004)
90 Jonesboro (Eliminated on June 26, 2004, due to budget cuts; covered by routes 95, 11, 17, 55, 78, and 48)
91 Henderson Mill Rd. (Eliminated on September 25, 2010, due to budget cuts)
92 Perimeter Mall (later 92 Peachtree Dunwoody; eliminated on March 27, 1999)
93 Bankhead (Eliminated by 1981)
94 Northeast Freeway (Eliminated by 1987)
95 Tilly Mill/Happy Hollow (Reduced to special limited service by 1981; eliminated by 1987)
96 Snapfinger Woods Drive (Created in 1979; eliminated on September 25, 2010, due to budget cuts)
97 Georgia Aquarium/Zoo Atlanta (Created in 1979; eliminated on September 25, 2010, due to budget cuts)
97A Atlanta Avenue (Created in 1979; eliminated by 1993)
97G Georgia Avenue (Created in 1979; eliminated by 1993)
98 West End / Arts Center (Created by 1983; eliminated on August 18, 2007)
99 North Avenue / Boulevard (Created in 1979; renumbered Route 899 on August 18, 2018)
100G Grady Express (Created by 1977; eliminated by 1981)
100L (Created by 1981; eliminated by 1993)
100M Model Cities Shuttle (Created by 1977; eliminated by 1993)
100S Swallow Circle (Created by 1977; eliminated by 1993)
100 Carver Homes / Grady Homes (Created by 1977; eliminated on August 25, 2001, due to low ridership)
100 Atlanta Tourist Loop Downtown (Created on April 29, 2006; eliminated on August 18, 2007)
101 Kensington / Dunwoody Express (Created in late 1999; eliminated on March 23, 2002, due to budget cuts)
101 Atlanta Tourist Loop Midtown (Created May 27, 2006; eliminated on August 18, 2007)
102 Holmes / Dunwoody Express (Created in 1998; eliminated on December 5, 1998, due to low ridership)
105 West End / Grant Park (Eliminated on March 23, 2002, due to budget cuts)
105 Barfield Road/Glenridge Drive (Created on August 18, 2007; eliminated on September 25, 2010, due to budget cuts)
109 Monroe Drive / Boulevard (Created April 16, 2016; renumbered Route 809 on August 18, 2018)
113 Atlantic Station/Auburn Avenue (Created on July 22, 2006; eliminated on September 25, 2010, due to budget cuts)
116B Lithonia Express (Created as a Blue Flyer on December 15, 2003; renumbered Route 216 in early 2004)
118 Rockbridge Rd/Stone Mtn. Village (Eliminated on September 25, 2010, due to budget cuts)
119 Memorial Drive Park & Ride (Created by 1987; eliminated by 1993)
122 GA Perimeter College (Eliminated on September 25, 2010, due to budget cuts)
128 Northridge (Created on June 26, 2004; renumbered Route 328 on December 23, 2006)
129 Chamblee / Dunwoody (Eliminated on June 26, 2004, due to budget cuts; half merged with Route 135 to create Route 103, rest merged into Route 132)
129 New Peachtree (Created on July 22, 2006; renumbered Route 329 on December 23, 2006)
130 Woodcock (Created by 1979; eliminated on June 26, 2004, due to budget cuts; combined with Route 47)
133 Doraville Park & Ride (Created by 1987; replaced by Routes 65 and 70 by 1988)
135 North Shallowford (Created by 1988; eliminated on June 26, 2004, due to budget cuts; merged with half of Route 129 to create Route 103)
137 Collier Rd. (Created on August 18, 2007; eliminated on September 25, 2010, due to budget cuts)
139 Lenox/Plaza Fiesta (Created December 23, 2006; eliminated on September 25, 2010, due to budget cuts)
141 North Point Mall (Created by 1996; eliminated on March 23, 2002, due to budget cuts with north portion transferred to Route 140; restored (replacing that section of Route 140) on April 16, 2016, as Mansell Park & Ride/ Haynes Bridge Road/ Windward Park & Ride)
142 Cooper Street (Merged into Route 42 by 1988)
142 Crabapple (Created by 1996; eliminated in late 1999 due to low ridership)
145 Abernathy Park & Ride (Discontinued by 1988)
145 Kensington/Emory Express (changed to a Blue Flyer and renumbered Route 145B Kensington/Emory Express on December 15, 2003)
145B Kensington/Emory Express (Eliminated on June 26, 2004, due to budget cuts)
151 Perimeter West (Created by 1996; eliminated on March 23, 2002, due to budget cuts)
151 Perimeter Center/Chamblee (Created April 26, 2008; eliminated on September 25, 2010, due to budget cuts)
152 (Eliminated on June 25, 1997, due to low ridership)
154 Sunday Van Service (Created in 2003, as the 150 Dunwoody Village did not run on Sundays; eliminated on June 26, 2004, due to budget cuts)
160 Boulder Park (Created by 1981; eliminated on September 25, 2010, due to budget cuts)
164 Kimberly / Country Squire (Created in late 1999; eliminated on June 26, 2004, due to budget cuts; part merged with Route 71 and rest covered by Routes 170, 66 and 74)
166 Ben Hill (Created by 1987; eliminated on June 26, 2004, due to budget cuts; most of the route merged with Route 83; restored on December 23, 2006, as Route 183)
170 Brownlee Rd. / Peyton (Created by 1981; eliminated on April 15, 2017; part merged with Route 66 and rest covered by Route 68)
173 South Fulton/ Westgate Park (Created on March 27, 1999; eliminated on March 23, 2002, due to budget cuts; merged with Route 73)
182 Headland Dr. / Barge Rd. Park/Ride (Created on April 16, 2005; eliminated on August 15, 2009, replaced by Routes 66 and 82)
190 Shannon Mall / Fairburn (Created by 1981; eliminated on June 26, 2004, due to budget cuts; merged with Route 89 and part became new Route 289)
193 Sylvan Hills (Route renumbered to Route 79 on March 21, 2015, as a restoration of Route 79 Friendly, which was eliminated on June 26, 2004)
197 Atlanta Ave. / Hill St. (Created on July 23, 2005; renumbered Route 397 in February 2007)
216 Lithonia Express (Eliminated on September 25, 2010, due to budget cuts)
245 Kensington/Emory Express (Eliminated on September 25, 2010, due to budget cuts)
273 Fulton Industrial Express (Eliminated on September 25, 2010, due to budget cuts)
283 Campbellton Road Blue Flyer (Eliminated on December 23, 2006, and replaced with Routes 83 and new Route 183)
289 South Fulton Blue Flyer (Created on June 26, 2004; renumbered Route 181 on April 26, 2008)
300 Airport Express (Created by 1987; eliminated when the Orange Line Extension opened)
300 Laredo/Kensington Shuttle (Eliminated on June 26, 2004, due to budget cuts)
305 Barfield (Created December 23, 2006; renumbered Route 105 on September 6, 2008)
311 McDaniel St./ Pittsburgh (Created on August 18, 2007; eliminated on September 25, 2010, due to budget cuts)
316 Stonecrest Mall Shuttle (Created December 24, 2005; became part of Route 116 on December 23, 2006)
320 College Park (Renumbered from Route 20 on December 24, 2005; eliminated on August 18, 2007)
324 Belvedere (Renumbered from Route 24 on December 24, 2005, but changed back to Route 24 on December 23, 2006)
328 Spalding/Northridge (Eliminated on September 25, 2010, due to budget cuts)
329 New Peachtree (Eliminated on September 25, 2010, due to budget cuts)
341 Windsor Parkway/Lynwood Park (Renumbered from Route 41 on August 18, 2007; eliminated on September 25, 2010, due to budget cuts)
350 Farmer's Market (Eliminated on October 1, 2001, due to low ridership)
364 Beecher (Renumbered from Route 64 on December 24, 2005; eliminated on September 25, 2010, due to budget cuts)
376 Ft. McPherson (Renumbered from Route 76 on December 24, 2005; eliminated on September 25, 2010, due to budget cuts)
389 South Fulton/ Buffington Rd. (Created December 24, 2005; eliminated on September 25, 2010, due to budget cuts)
393 Sylvan Road (Created on April 28, 2007; renumbered Route 193 in May 2008)
397 Cherokee Ave/Grant Park (Renumbered from Route 197 in February 2007; eliminated on September 25, 2010, due to budget cuts)
455 Zoo Shuttle (Created by 1993; eliminated in 2000 due to low ridership)
520 Memorial Drive BRT Limited (Eliminated September 2013)
521 Memorial Drive BRT Express (Eliminated September 2013)
701 Ridgemore (Eliminated on March 23, 2002, due to budget cuts)
702 Arden / Northside (Eliminated on March 23, 2002, due to budget cuts)
703 Tuxedo (Eliminated on March 23, 2002, due to budget cuts)
704 Paces Ferry (Eliminated on March 23, 2002, due to budget cuts)
705 Randall Mill / Rockingham / King Mill (Eliminated on March 23, 2002, due to budget cuts)
705A Randall Mill / King Mill (Eliminated on March 23, 2002, due to budget cuts)
705B Randall Mill (Eliminated on March 23, 2002, due to budget cuts)
706 Garmon / Davis (Eliminated on March 23, 2002, due to budget cuts)
707 Whitewater / Jett Road (Eliminated on March 23, 2002, due to budget cuts)
708 Jett / Rebel (Eliminated on March 23, 2002, due to budget cuts)
709 Lake Forest (Eliminated on March 23, 2002, due to budget cuts)
710A River chase (Eliminated on March 23, 2002, due to budget cuts)
710B Davis Drive (Eliminated on March 23, 2002, due to budget cuts)
711 Riverside / Brandon Mill (Eliminated on March 23, 2002, due to budget cuts)
711A Riverside (Eliminated on March 23, 2002, due to budget cuts)
711B Brandon Mill (Eliminated on March 23, 2002, due to budget cuts)
712 Vernon Woods / Dalrymple (Eliminated on March 23, 2002, due to budget cuts)
713 Glenridge Forest (Eliminated on March 23, 2002, due to budget cuts)
714 Happy Hollow / Meadow Lake (Eliminated on March 23, 2002, due to budget cuts)
715 Peachtree Dunwoody (Eliminated on March 23, 2002, due to budget cuts)
716 Beacon Hill (Eliminated on March 23, 2002, due to budget cuts)
717 Sagamore Hills (Eliminated on March 23, 2002, due to budget cuts)
718 Northeast Freeway Industrial (Created by 1993; eliminated on March 23, 2002, due to budget cuts)
A West End / Lenox Square Crosstown (Eliminated by 1983)
B Westview / Buckhead (Eliminated by 1981)
C Lenox Square / Executive Park / Thomasville (Eliminated in 1979)
D Decatur / North Springs (Eliminated in 1979)
DE Decatur / Emory (Eliminated in 1979)
F Doraville / Decatur (Eliminated in 1979)
G South DeKalb-North DeKalb Crosstown (Eliminated in 1979)
H Stone Mountain / Brookhaven (Eliminated by 1987)
Braves Shuttle (Formerly Stadium Shuttle; eliminated on September 25, 2010, due to budget cuts; Restored by April 8, 2011; Eliminated on August 5, 2017 due to the Atlanta Braves relocating to SunTrust Park)
Amphitheater Shuttle (Eliminated on May 17, 2014)
Atlantic Station Shuttle (Temporary shuttle in August 2013)
Lakewood Shuttle (Eliminated on January 1, 2011)
Loopride (Eliminated by 1981)
Dome Shuttle (Eliminated by 1996)

Metropolitan Atlanta Rapid Transit Authority
Atlanta